The Hamline Pipers football team represents Hamline University in the sport of American football. The team played the first intercollegiate football game in Minnesota on September 30, 1882. The team lost to Minnesota, 4-0.

A founding member, Hamline has been a member of the Minnesota Intercollegiate Athletic Conference since 1920.

References

 
American football teams established in 1882
1882 establishments in Minnesota